Paul Olarewaju Ojo is an Anglican bishop in Nigeria: a former Archdeacon, since 2018 he has been the Bishop of Ijumu, one of seventeen dioceses within the Anglican Province of Abuja, itself one of 14 provinces within the Church of Nigeria.

Notes

Living people
Anglican bishops of Ijumu
21st-century Anglican bishops in Nigeria
Year of birth missing (living people)
Church of Nigeria archdeacons